A Mind Forever Voyaging (AMFV) is a 1985 interactive fiction game designed and implemented by Steve Meretzky and published by Infocom. The game was intended as a polemical critique of Ronald Reagan's politics.

Plot

The story is set in the United States of North America, which is similar to the real-world United States, in the year 2031. The player controls PRISM, the world's first sentient computer.

PRISM is instructed by its creator, Dr. Abraham Perelman, to run a simulation of Senator Richard Ryder's "Plan for Renewed National Purpose". This plan is intended to address the nation's failing economy, the high teenage suicide rate, and to strengthen the nation's position in a nuclear arms race.

PRISM simulates the life of a man called Perry Simm, ten years after the plan has gone into effect. The player experiences some time in Perry's life. The plan appears to have had positive effects. Based on this simulation, the plan is deemed viable and preparations are set in motion.

However, Perelman feels that the ten-year simulation isn't enough, and makes PRISM do a simulation of the situation 20 years after the plan started, and then 30 years. Perelman is concerned by the simulations, but he needs more evidence to discredit the plan, as there are powerful people behind it. PRISM does a 40-year simulation, and with that still not quite satisfying Perelman, a 50-year simulation. The simulations show the situation becoming worse and worse with time.

PRISM goes into sleep mode while Perelman is preparing to present the findings to the government. When it wakes up, the facility is locked down by the military. Senator Ryder comes into Perelman's office and starts shouting at him. PRISM starts recording his words. After Ryder has left, suspicious "maintenance workers" come to the facility and make their way to PRISM's core, but PRISM renders them harmless. Then a news interface becomes available, and PRISM broadcasts the recording of Ryder's intimidation. The plan is thoroughly discredited and Senator Ryder is publicly disgraced.

Development 
Meretzky, the author, said in an interview that his intent with the game was to convey a negative view of Reagan's policies. In another interview, he said that he had hoped for AMFV to cause controversy with its political content, expressing disappointment at the lack of hate mail.

Reception
Computer Gaming World states that parts of AMFV are "transcendent". In a 1998 retrospective review, AllGame gives the Macintosh version three-and-a-half stars out of five, saying that the game provides fun exploration, but has hardly any replay value. In 2014, Adventure Gamers gave the game four stars out of five in its retrospective review, calling it "bold" and "innovative", but saying that it does not quite reach its goals.

Next Generation lists it as number 66 on their "Top 100 Games of All Time" in 1996, commending the game for trying to be more "deep" than most other games.

See also

Simulated reality
Societal collapse

References

External links

Overview of A Mind Forever Voyaging (archived)
Source text of The Prelude Book 3, Chapter Residence at Cambridge
The Infocom Gallery entry for A Mind Forever Voyaging with photos of all feelies, manual and decoder table
The Infocom Bugs List entry for A Mind Forever Voyaging
"How A Mind Forever Voyaging Took Aim at Right-Wing Politics", February 28, 2017 entry from Glixel
Infocom Cabinet: A Mind Forever Voyaging

1980s interactive fiction
1985 video games
Adventure games
Amiga games
Apple II games
Atari ST games
Commodore 128 games
Classic Mac OS games
DOS games
Infocom games
Political video games
Single-player video games
Steve Meretzky games
Video games developed in the United States
Video games set in South Dakota
Video games set in the 2030s
Video games set in the 2040s
Video games set in the 2050s
Video games set in the 2060s
Video games set in the 2070s
Video games set in the 2080s
Video games set in the 2090s